Diplomacy is a 1926 American silent mystery film produced by Famous Players-Lasky and distributed through Paramount Pictures. The movie is an update of the play Dora by Victorien Sardou. Marshall Neilan directs his then wife Blanche Sweet who stars.

Cast
Blanche Sweet as Dora
Neil Hamilton as Julian Weymouth
Arlette Marchal as Countess Zicka
Matt Moore as Robert Lowry
Gustav von Seyffertitz as Baron Ballin
Earle Williams as Sir Henry Weymouth
Arthur Edmund Carewe as Count Orloff
Julia Swayne Gordon as Marquise de Zares
David Mir as Reggie Cowan
Charles "Buddy" Post as the baron's secretary
Mario Carillo as John Stramir
Sojin Kamiyama as Chinese diplomat
Edgar Norton as servant
Linda Landi as servant

Preservation status
A copy of the film is preserved at the Library of Congress.

See also
Blanche Sweet filmography

References

External links
 
 
Lobby poster
Blanche Sweet and Marshall Neilan during promotional for the film

1926 films
1920s mystery drama films
American mystery drama films
American silent feature films
American black-and-white films
Famous Players-Lasky films
American films based on plays
Films based on works by Victorien Sardou
Films directed by Marshall Neilan
Paramount Pictures films
1926 drama films
1920s American films
Silent American drama films
Silent mystery drama films
1920s English-language films